Żelazny Most (meaning "iron bridge") may refer to the following places in Poland:
Żelazny Most in Gmina Polkowice, Polkowice County in Lower Silesian Voivodeship (SW Poland)
Żelazny Most (lake) in  Gmina Polkowice, Polkowice County in Lower Silesian Voivodeship (SW Poland), the largest sump reservoir of froth in Europe
Other places called Żelazny Most (listed in Polish Wikipedia)